West New Annan is a community in the Canadian province of Nova Scotia, located in  Colchester County .

References 

 West New Annan on Destination Nova Scotia

Communities in Colchester County
General Service Areas in Nova Scotia